Sigma Sigma Sigma, also known as Tri Sigma, is a national American women's sorority.

Sigma Sigma Sigma is a member of the National Panhellenic Conference (NPC), an umbrella organization encompassing 26 national sororities or women's fraternities, which focus on service, education, scholarship programming and social activities. Once a sorority exclusively for teacher's/educational colleges, Tri Sigma became a full NPC member in 1951 and, as a social sorority, now admits members without limits based on major. The sorority counts a membership of more than 136,000 women, hosts chapters on more than 100 college campuses, and maintains over 90 alumnae chapters. The sorority's own headquarters are located in Woodstock, Virginia.

History 

The State Female Normal School in Farmville, Virginia (now known as Longwood University) was the state's first institution to open its doors to teacher education. Eight students, Margaret Batten, Louise Davis, Martha Trent Featherston, Isabella Merrick, Sallie Michie, Lelia Scott, Elizabeth Watkins, and Lucy Wright founded the sorority in 1898. Scott and Wright led the first meetings of their secret society, the S.S.S. Club, in 1897. On April 20, 1898, these women officially announced the founding of the Greek letter society known as Sigma Sigma Sigma.

At the same time, Lucy Wright's roommate, Julia Tyler, was working to found Kappa Delta sorority. In the fall of 1898, Zeta Tau Alpha was founded, followed by the founding of Alpha Sigma Alpha in 1901. These four sororities were all founded at the State Female Normal School and were henceforth referred to as the "Farmville Four".

In its first decade, Tri Sigma recognized the need for both legal recognition as a social body and a written record of organization. Therefore, they filed documents with the Commonwealth of Virginia and received their Charter of Incorporation on February 12, 1903. Tri Sigma's first constitution was adopted by its first chapter, the Alpha chapter, in April 1903.

In the first decade since the sorority's inception, the founders took steps to lay the groundwork of the sorority's foundation, including joining the Association of Education Sororities. In 1915, Tri Sigma absorbed the two remaining chapters of Sigma Delta Chi sorority. Additional collegiate chapters were established and all members met at a convention. As the sorority grew, the national nature of Tri Sigma solidified with the standardization of a ceremony for new members and the establishment of a Founder's Day to celebrate the founding of Sigma Sigma Sigma.

Tri Sigma men 
James Miller Leake, a member of Kappa Sigma Fraternity, was the only man permitted to wear the badge of the sorority and is counted as a member of Tri Sigma due to his help with drafting the constitution and writing the initiation ritual. Though Leake is the only man counted as a member, other men are credited with assisting in the sorority's founding, including men from Kappa Sigma at Hampden Sydney College: H.W. Cole (who assisted with the constitution), Garret G. Gooch, Alex J. Boyer and Robert Miller. Marvin Smithey (a member of Kappa Alpha Order and brother of a Kappa Delta member in its Alpha chapter) offered legal services to secure the first charter.

Modern day 
In 1951, Sigma Sigma Sigma became a full member of the National Panhellenic Conference and has so far chaired the NPC once, with Mary K. Barbee serving as Chairman from 1981–1983. The NPC rotates chairs every two years between its member organizations in the chronological order of each group's joining date.

Each initiated member receives the latest edition of Tri Sigma's story,The Path from Farmville and "Over a Century of Sisterhood", which chronicles the beginnings of each collegiate chapter as well as the evolution of the national organization. Members also receive a lifetime subscription to their national magazine, The Triangle of Sigma Sigma Sigma, which is published three times a year.

The sorority now counts more than 136,000 women as members. Sigma Sigma Sigma was the first NPC sorority to adopt a position statement for gender inclusivity, and also was the first NPC sorority to have a chapter in Alaska.

Symbols 

The official colors are royal purple and pure white. The pearl was designated as the official jewel in 1909. The official flower is the purple violet, while the sailboat is the official symbol.

The coat-of-arms came into use in 1902, designed by Harriet Henkins of the sorority's Alpha chapter. All the symbols on the shield may be used for jewelry, recognition pins, stationery, and formal clothing. From the upper left to lower right is the "bar" or "band" displaying three Greek sigmas. Above the band in the right third are spreading wings joined by a centered circle, and above these is an equilateral triangle on which is engraved a single Sigma. Below the wings are clasped hands and in the lower left third is a flaming urn. On the banner below the shield are the words in Greek of the sorority's open motto, "Faithful Unto Death".

Adopted in 1903, the badge of the sorority is an equilateral gold triangle bordered with pearls, with a small semi circular indentation on each side. On the gold triangle is a raised black enamel triangle bearing a gold sigma in each corner. In the center of the badge is another symbol of the sorority, a skull and crossbones.

Philanthropy 
The Sigma Sigma Sigma Foundation is a non-profit corporation formed in 1992. It distributes funds for charitable, educational, and miscellaneous purposes, including programs that support women's leadership, student grants and scholarships, and play therapy programs for hospitalized children. The organization centers its latter philanthropic efforts around the theme “Sigma Serves Children,” specifically through the Robbie Page Memorial (RPM).

On September 15, 1951, Robbie Page, the son of Tri Sigma's National President, died of bulbar polio, a disease which at that time had no cure or vaccine; this death prompted his parents to establish a memorial fund in his honor. The sorority adopted this fund as its official philanthropy in 1954. In its early years, the RPM supported various polio research projects, including the Salk vaccine trials. It now focuses on supporting play therapy for hospitalized children and providing support for playrooms, libraries, and programs for children undergoing long-term hospital care.

Current national efforts are centered in funding fellowships at the Children's Medical Center in Dallas, Texas, and in funding graduate assistantships at the University of North Carolina Hospitals in Chapel Hill, North Carolina. At UNC, the sorority also funds the Robbie Page Play Atrium. The National Therapeutic Recreation Society has recognized Sigma Sigma Sigma for their support of Child Life and Play Therapy Programs. In 2016, Sigma Sigma Sigma added the March of Dimes as a national philanthropic partner.

Membership

National Headquarters 
Tri Sigma's National Memorial Headquarters is located in Woodstock, Virginia at the Mabel Lee Walton House, a historical landmark. Named after the sorority's third National President, the Walton House serves as the main operations center of Tri Sigma, where day-to-day business is conducted. The sorority acquired the house in 1963; the contributions of individual members, and the dues and fees of alumnae and collegiate chapters, helped to purchase and furnish the property and to maintain it still.

Notable alumnae

Chapters

Leadership

National Presidents

Conventions 
The sorority currently holds conventions every three years at various locations.

References

Further reading

External links 

 
1898 establishments in Virginia
National Panhellenic Conference
Student societies in the United States
Longwood University
Student organizations established in 1898
Former members of Professional Fraternity Association